Blood of Kingu was a black metal band from Ukraine formed in 2005 by Roman Saenko, the main member of Drudkh, Dark Ages and Hate Forest.

Lyrically, Blood of Kingu deals with Sumerian/Ancient Egyptian and Indo-European mythology and history. The vocals include death growls as well as Tibetan chants..

On 7 December 2007, they released their first album, De occulta philosophia. It was re-released with alternate layout and packaging.

Their second album, Sun in the House of the Scorpion, was recorded in the autumn of 2009 and released on 24 May 2010 by Candlelight Records.

On mid-2016, Blood of Kingu had announced on their Facebook page that the band has ended. After that, Roman Saenko has started another new Black metal band called "Windswept" which its debut album will be released in March 2017 with its first track "Blinding and Bottomless abyss is howling". Its lyrical inspiration is mostly from nature, similar to Drudkh

Discography
De occulta philosophia – 2007
Sun in the House of the Scorpion – 2010
Dark Star on the Right Horn of the Crescent Moon – 2014

Final line-up
 Roman Saenko – vocals, guitar, keyboards (2005–2016)
 Thurios – guitar (2007–2016)
 Krechet – bass (2007–2016)
 Yuriy Sinitsky – drums (2007–2016)
 Vlad – keyboards (2014–2016)

References

External links
 Official Myspace
 Debemur Morti Productions
 Supernal Music

Ukrainian black metal musical groups
Musical groups established in 2005
Musical quartets
Candlelight Records artists
Season of Mist artists
Musical groups from Kharkiv